In mathematical modeling, overfitting is "the production of an analysis that corresponds too closely or exactly to a particular set of data, and may therefore fail to fit to additional data or predict future observations reliably". An overfitted model is a mathematical model that contains more parameters than can be justified by the data. The essence of overfitting is to have unknowingly extracted some of the residual variation (i.e., the noise) as if that variation represented underlying model structure.

Underfitting occurs when a mathematical model cannot adequately capture the underlying structure of the data. An under-fitted model is a model where some parameters or terms that would appear in a correctly specified model are missing. Under-fitting would occur, for example, when fitting a linear model to non-linear data. Such a model will tend to have poor predictive performance.

The possibility of over-fitting exists because the criterion used for selecting the model is not the same as the criterion used to judge the suitability of a model. For example, a model might be selected by maximizing its performance on some set of training data, and yet its suitability might be determined by its ability to perform well on unseen data; then over-fitting occurs when a model begins to "memorize" training data rather than "learning" to generalize from a trend. 

As an extreme example, if the number of parameters is the same as or greater than the number of observations, then a model can perfectly predict the training data simply by memorizing the data in its entirety. (For an illustration, see Figure 2.) Such a model, though, will typically fail severely when making predictions. 

The potential for overfitting depends not only on the number of parameters and data but also the conformability of the model structure with the data shape, and the magnitude of model error compared to the expected level of noise or error in the data. Even when the fitted model does not have an excessive number of parameters, it is to be expected that the fitted relationship will appear to perform less well on a new data set than on the data set used for fitting (a phenomenon sometimes known as shrinkage). In particular, the value of the coefficient of determination will shrink relative to the original data.

To lessen the chance or amount of overfitting, several techniques are available (e.g., model comparison, cross-validation, regularization, early stopping, pruning, Bayesian priors, or dropout). The basis of some techniques is either (1) to explicitly penalize overly complex models or (2) to test the model's ability to generalize by evaluating its performance on a set of data not used for training, which is assumed to approximate the typical unseen data that a model will encounter.

Statistical inference

In statistics, an inference is drawn from a statistical model, which has been selected via some procedure. Burnham & Anderson, in their much-cited text on model selection, argue that to avoid overfitting, we should adhere to the "Principle of Parsimony". The authors also state the following.

Overfitting is more likely to be a serious concern when there is little theory available to guide the analysis, in part because then there tend to be a large number of models to select from. The book Model Selection and Model Averaging (2008) puts it this way.

Regression
In regression analysis, overfitting occurs frequently. As an extreme example, if there are p variables in a linear regression with p data points, the fitted line can go exactly through every point. For logistic regression or Cox proportional hazards models, there are a variety of rules of thumb (e.g. 5–9, 10 and 10–15 — the guideline of 10 observations per independent variable is known as the "one in ten rule"). In the process of regression model selection, the mean squared error of the random regression function can be split into random noise, approximation bias, and variance in the estimate of the regression function. The bias–variance tradeoff is often used to overcome overfit models.

With a large set of explanatory variables that actually have no relation to the dependent variable being predicted, some variables will in general be falsely found to be statistically significant and the researcher may thus retain them in the model, thereby overfitting the model. This is known as Freedman's paradox.

Machine learning

Usually a learning algorithm is trained using some set of "training data": exemplary situations for which the desired output is known. The goal is that the algorithm will also perform well on predicting the output when fed "validation data" that was not encountered during its training.

Overfitting is the use of models or procedures that violate Occam's razor, for example by including more adjustable parameters than are ultimately optimal, or by using a more complicated approach than is ultimately optimal. For an example where there are too many adjustable parameters, consider a dataset where training data for  can be adequately predicted by a linear function of two independent variables. Such a function requires only three parameters (the intercept and two slopes). Replacing this simple function with a new, more complex quadratic function, or with a new, more complex linear function on more than two independent variables, carries a risk: Occam's razor implies that any given complex function is a priori less probable than any given simple function. If the new, more complicated function is selected instead of the simple function, and if there was not a large enough gain in training-data fit to offset the complexity increase, then the new complex function "overfits" the data, and the complex overfitted function will likely perform worse than the simpler function on validation data outside the training dataset, even though the complex function performed as well, or perhaps even better, on the training dataset.

When comparing different types of models, complexity cannot be measured solely by counting how many parameters exist in each model; the expressivity of each parameter must be considered as well. For example, it is nontrivial to directly compare the complexity of a neural net (which can track curvilinear relationships) with  parameters to a regression model with  parameters.

Overfitting is especially likely in cases where learning was performed too long or where training examples are rare, causing the learner to adjust to very specific random features of the training data that have no causal relation to the target function. In this process of overfitting, the performance on the training examples still increases while the performance on unseen data becomes worse.

As a simple example, consider a database of retail purchases that includes the item bought, the purchaser, and the date and time of purchase. It's easy to construct a model that will fit the training set perfectly by using the date and time of purchase to predict the other attributes, but this model will not generalize at all to new data, because those past times will never occur again.

Generally, a learning algorithm is said to overfit relative to a simpler one if it is more accurate in fitting known data (hindsight) but less accurate in predicting new data (foresight). One can intuitively understand overfitting from the fact that information from all past experience can be divided into two groups: information that is relevant for the future, and irrelevant information ("noise"). Everything else being equal, the more difficult a criterion is to predict (i.e., the higher its uncertainty), the more noise exists in past information that needs to be ignored. The problem is determining which part to ignore. A learning algorithm that can reduce the risk of fitting noise is called "robust."

Consequences
The most obvious consequence of overfitting is poor performance on the validation dataset. Other negative consequences include:

 A function that is overfitted is likely to request more information about each item in the validation dataset than does the optimal function; gathering this additional unneeded data can be expensive or error-prone, especially if each individual piece of information must be gathered by human observation and manual data-entry.
 A more complex, overfitted function is likely to be less portable than a simple one. At one extreme, a one-variable linear regression is so portable that, if necessary, it could even be done by hand. At the other extreme are models that can be reproduced only by exactly duplicating the original modeler's entire setup, making reuse or scientific reproduction difficult.

Remedy
The optimal function usually needs verification on bigger or completely new datasets.  There are, however, methods like minimum spanning tree or life-time of correlation that applies the dependence between correlation coefficients and time-series (window width). Whenever the window width is big enough, the correlation coefficients are stable and don't depend on the window width size anymore. Therefore, a correlation matrix can be created by calculating a coefficient of correlation between investigated variables. This matrix can be represented topologically as a complex network where direct and indirect influences between variables are visualized. Dropout regularisation can also improve robustness and therefore reduce over-fitting by probabilistically removing inputs to a layer.

Underfitting

Underfitting is the inverse of overfitting, meaning that the statistical model or machine learning algorithm is too simplistic to accurately capture the patterns in the data. A sign of underfitting is that there is a high bias and low variance detected in the current model or algorithm used (the inverse of overfitting: low bias and high variance). This can be gathered from the Bias-variance tradeoff which is the method of analyzing a model or algorithm for bias error, variance error and irreducible error. With a high bias and low variance the result of the model is that it will inaccurately represent the data points and thus insufficiently be able to predict future data results (see Generalization error). Shown in Figure 5 the linear line could not represent all the given data points due to the line not resembling the curvature of the points. We would expect to see a parabola shaped line as shown in Figure 6 and Figure 1. As previously mentioned if we were to use Figure 5 for analysis we would get false predictive results contrary to the results if we analyzed Figure 6.

Burnham & Anderson state the following.

Resolving underfitting
There are multiple ways to deal with underfitting:

 Increase the complexity of the model: If the model is too simple, it may be necessary to increase its complexity by adding more features, increasing the number of parameters, or using a more flexible model. However, this should be done carefully to avoid overfitting.
 Use a different algorithm: If the current algorithm is not able to capture the patterns in the data, it may be necessary to try a different one. For example, a neural network may be more effective than a linear regression model for some types of data.
 Increase the amount of training data: If the model is underfitting due to lack of data, increasing the amount of training data may help. This will allow the model to better capture the underlying patterns in the data.
 Regularization: Regularization is a technique used to prevent overfitting by adding a penalty term to the loss function that discourages large parameter values. It can also be used to prevent underfitting by controlling the complexity of the model.
 Ensemble Methods: Ensemble methods combine multiple models to create a more accurate prediction. This can help to reduce underfitting by allowing multiple models to work together to capture the underlying patterns in the data.
 Feature engineering: Feature engineering involves creating new model features from the existing ones that may be more relevant to the problem at hand. This can help to improve the accuracy of the model and prevent underfitting.

See also 

 Bias–variance tradeoff
 Curve fitting
 Data dredging
 Feature selection
 Feature engineering
 Freedman's paradox 
 Generalization error
 Goodness of fit
 Life-time of correlation
 Model selection
 Researcher degrees of freedom
 Occam's razor
 Primary model
 Vapnik–Chervonenkis dimension – larger VC dimension implies larger risk of overfitting

Notes

References 
 
 
 Tip 7: Minimize overfitting.

Further reading

External links 
 Overfitting: when accuracy measure goes wrong – introductory video tutorial
 The Problem of Overfitting Data – Stony Brook University
 What is "overfitting," exactly? – Andrew Gelman blog
 CSE546: Linear Regression Bias / Variance Tradeoff – University of Washington
 Underfitting and Overfitting in machine learning and how to deal with it !!! – Towards Data Science
 What is Underfitting – IBM
 ML | Underfitting and Overfitting – Geeks for Geeks article - Dewang Nautiyal

Curve fitting
Applied mathematics
Mathematical modeling
Statistical inference
Machine learning